Naroli is a village in Bayana tehsil, Bharatpur district, Rajasthan, India.

References

External links

Villages in Bharatpur district